Haixinsha Station is a metro station of the Guangzhou Metro APM line. It is located at the underground of Haixinsha Island, venue of the opening and closing ceremonies of the 2010 Asian Games. It started operation on 24 February 2011, three months after the games ended.

Station layout

Exits

References

Railway stations in Guangdong
Railway stations in China opened in 2011
Guangzhou Metro stations in Tianhe District